James West (April, 23 1905 – June, 1970), nicknamed "Shifty Jim", was an American Negro league first baseman during the 1930s and 1940s.

A native of Mobile, Alabama, West was selected starting first baseman in the 1936 East–West All-Star Game, and was an all-star again in 1942. The great-uncle of fellow Negro leaguer Henry Elmore, West died in Philadelphia, Pennsylvania in 1970 at age 58.

References

External links
 and Baseball-Reference Black Baseball stats and Seamheads

1911 births
1970 deaths
Baltimore Elite Giants players
Birmingham Black Barons players
Cleveland Cubs players
Columbus Elite Giants players
Indianapolis Clowns players
Memphis Red Sox players
Nashville Elite Giants players
New York Black Yankees players
Philadelphia Stars players
Washington Elite Giants players
20th-century African-American sportspeople
Baseball infielders